Tauno Olavi Sipilä (7 November 1921, Multia, Central Finland - 9 July 2001) was a Finnish cross-country skier who competed in the 1950s. At the 1954 FIS Nordic World Ski Championships in Falun, he finished fifth in the 30 km event.

Sipilä also finished eighth in the 18 km event at the 1952 Winter Olympics in Oslo.

Cross-country skiing results
All results are sourced from the International Ski Federation (FIS).

Olympic Games

World Championships

References

External links
Discontinued men's Olympic cross-country skiing events 

1921 births
2001 deaths
People from Multia
Olympic cross-country skiers of Finland
Cross-country skiers at the 1952 Winter Olympics
Finnish male cross-country skiers
Sportspeople from Central Finland
20th-century Finnish people